Nuestra Belleza Aguascalientes 2012 was held at the Antiguo Taller de Locomotoras, Aguascalientes, Aguascalientes on July 19, 2012. At the conclusion of the final night of competition Jessica Amor of Aguascalientes City was crowned the winner. Amor was crowned by outgoing Nuestra Belleza Aguascalientes and Nuestra Belleza México titleholder Karina González. Eight contestants competed for the title.

Results

Placements

Contestants

References

External links
Official Website

Nuestra Belleza México